A formal trilogue meeting, more commonly known as a trilogue, is a type of meeting used in the European Union (EU) legislative process. It takes its name from a literary form, the trilogue, which means a conversation with three parties.

Trilogue negotiations are not provided for in EU treaties.  They are used if the Council of the European Union does not agree to the amendments proposed by the European Parliament at the second reading. In this case, formal trilogue negotiations are carried out within the framework of a conciliation committee. A trilogue is understood as an equally composite tripartite meeting between those involved in the legislative process of the EU institutions.  These bodies are the European Commission (EC), the Council of the European Union and the European Parliament. The European Commission takes on the mediating function.

Critics argue that the use of trilogues is detrimental to transparency in the legislative process.  They believe the EC uses this process to bypass public transparency and the supposed opposition the proposed legislation would cause.
Once the Conciliation committee agrees on a text, neither the Parliament nor Council are able to change it, although in their respective final vote (third reading) they can reject the whole text.

See also
 United States congressional conference committee

References

European Union legislative procedure
Meetings
Politics of the European Union